Edith Lillie Kent ( Carter, 24 November 1908 – 24 August 2012) was a British electrical welder from Plymouth, England during the Second World War. She was the first woman in Great Britain to be given equal pay.

History
Kent took a job as a welder at Devonport Dockyard in Plymouth in 1941, where she was paid £5 6s a week. She became the first woman to be employed at the dockyard. Kent had the advantage of being only 4 feet 11 inches tall, meaning that she was small enough to weld in places her male colleagues could not such as torpedo tubes.

In 1942, she gave birth to her only child, a daughter called Jean. She returned to work soon after she gave birth, however, leaving Jean in the care of one of her sisters. In 1943, she was given a pay rise, earning £6 6s. This was higher wage than the average for a male manual worker, which was £5 8s 6d. After the war had finished in 1945, she left her job when the male workforce returned from the front. She took up a new job as a barmaid. She lived with her husband Bill, who ran a shoe repair business. He died in 1996, aged 86.

Kent herself has said that she was embarrassed at the time of her achievement saying: "I got the job because my brothers worked at the dockyard and they thought I would be good at it. I was the first woman to work as a welder there. It made me a bit uncomfortable that I was the first woman to earn the same as the men – and in some cases I was earning more than them. All the men I worked with were marvellous and they didn't seem to mind me earning the same. None of them ever dared say it, but I think they knew I was worth as much as them, if not more."

Kent had an elder sister, Minna Algate, who died aged 106. Kent died in Plymouth in August 2012 at the age of 103.

References

1908 births
2012 deaths
English centenarians
People from Plymouth, Devon
Welders
Women centenarians
20th-century English women